Blood Moon or Bloodmoon may refer to:

Folklore and tradition
 Hunter's moon, the first full moon after the Harvest Moon
 Xquic, a mythological Mayan heroine sometimes glossed as "Blood Moon" or "Blood Girl/Maiden" in English
 Blood Moon (eclipse) , a popular term to describe the reddish color of the moon during the total lunar eclipse
 Blood moon prophecy, a prophecy surrounding the tetrad of lunar eclipses beginning April 2014

Film
 Bloodmoon (1990 film), an Australian horror film
 Bloodmoon (1997 film), an American martial arts film
 Blood Moon (2014 film), a British Western horror film
 Wolf Girl (film), a film with the alternate title Blood Moon

Literature
 Blood Moon, a novel by Hal Lindsey
 Blood Moon, a novel by Garry Disher

Music
 Blood Moon (Apes & Androids album), a 2008 album by Apes & Androids
 Blood Moon (Cold Chisel album), a 2019 album by Cold Chisel
 Blood Moon (EP), a 2021 EP by Oneus
 Bloodmoon: I, a 2021 album by Converge and Chelsea Wolfe, and "Blood Moon", a song on the album
 Blood Moon, a 2022 album by RY X

Television
 Bloodmoon, the working title for a canceled Game of Thrones successor series
 "Blood Moon" (CSI: Miami), an episode of CSI: Miami
 "Blood Moon", a season 5 episode of Quantum Leap
 "Blood Moon", an episode of Sleepy Hollow
 "Blood Moon Ball", an episode of Star vs. the Forces of Evil
 "Blood Moon" (Into the Dark), an episode of Into the Dark

Games
 The Elder Scrolls III: Bloodmoon, an expansion to the 2002 video game Morrowind
 Blood Moons are an event in The Legend of Zelda: Breath of the Wild and Hyrule Warriors: Age of Calamity.
 Red Moon in Syberia 3 is a rare lunar event, a part of the puzzle.
 Blood Moon in Terraria is a common randomly occurring event.

See also 
 
 
 Red Moon (disambiguation)